Jason, Son of Jason is a science fiction novel by American writer John Ulrich Giesy.  It was first published in book form in 1966 by Avalon Books.  The novel was originally serialized in five parts in the magazine Argosy All-Story beginning in April 1921.

Plot introduction
The third and final novel in the Jason Croft series once more brings Jason into contact with Dr. George Murray on Earth.  This time, Jason brings Dr. Murray along via astral projection to Palos.  Naia is suffering complications with her pregnancy, and Jason enlists the good doctor to help.  After the birth, the child and mother are kidnapped by the Zollarians, and Croft once again uses his knowledge of earth technology to overcome the challenges he faces.

External links
Page at Internet Speculative Fiction Database
 

1966 American novels
American science fiction novels
Novels first published in serial form
Works originally published in Argosy (magazine)
1921 American novels
Avalon Books books